Henry Loftus, 1st Earl of Ely KP, PC (Ire) (18 November 1709 – 8 May 1783), styled The Honourable from 1751 to 1769 and known as Henry Loftus, 4th Viscount Loftus from 1769 to 1771, was an Anglo-Irish peer and politician.

He was the younger son of Nicholas Loftus, 1st Viscount Loftus and Anne Ponsonby, daughter of William Ponsonby, 1st Viscount Duncannon.  His elder brother was Nicholas Hume-Loftus, 1st Earl of Ely of the first creation. 

He served as High Sheriff of Wexford in 1744 and between 1747 and 1768 represented Bannow in the Irish House of Commons. Subsequently, Loftus sat for Wexford County until 1769, when he succeeded his nephew Nicholas Hume-Loftus, 2nd Earl of Ely, as Viscount Loftus. During a celebrated hearing into his nephew's mental capacity, Loftus testified that the young man was of normal intelligence. Loftus was created Earl of Ely (second creation) in 1771 and was appointed a Knight Founder of the Order of St Patrick on 11 March 1783.

He married firstly in 1745 Frances Monroe, daughter of Henry Monroe of Roe's Hall, County Down. Frances was a leading figure in Dublin society who wielded some political influence, and was a much stronger character than her ineffectual husband, whom she seems to have dominated completely. She died in 1774. 

There is a portrait of the couple, with Lady Ely's nieces, Dorothea (Dolly) and Frances Monroe, the daughters of her brother Henry Monroe of Roe's  Hall, by the celebrated Swiss painter Angelica Kauffman, who visited Ireland in 1771. Dolly Monroe was one of the greatest beauties of the age, whose admirers included Henry Grattan and Oliver Goldsmith. She married the politician William Richardson, and died without issue in 1793. Her sister  Frances married Henry Read.

Henry married secondly Anne Bonfoy, daughter of Captain Henry Bonfoy and Anne Eliot, and sister of Edward Craggs-Eliot, 1st Baron Eliot. He had no issue by either marriage and at his death, his estates passed to his nephew Charles Loftus, 1st Marquess of Ely, the son of his sister Elizabeth and Sir John Tottenham, 1st Baronet. His widow died in 1821, having outlived her mother, who lived to be 97, by only 5 years.

References

1709 births
1783 deaths
18th-century Anglo-Irish people
Earls in the Peerage of Ireland
Loftus, Henry
Loftus, Henry
Loftus, Henry
Knights of St Patrick
Loftus, Henry
Members of the Privy Council of Ireland
High Sheriffs of Wexford